Mark Andrew McNulty (born November 10, 1944), a Seton Hall Law School graduate (JD 1973) and member of the Delaware Bar 1973, served as Secretary of the Department of Transportation in the cabinet of Delaware Governor Dale E. Wolf.

References

1944 births
Living people
State cabinet secretaries of Delaware
Delaware Republicans